Leandro dos Santos Candido, known as Leozão (born 6 June 1991) is a Brazilian football player who plays for UD Oliveirense.

Club career
He made his professional debut in the Campeonato Carioca for Madureira on 23 January 2013 in a game against Flamengo.

References

1991 births
Footballers from Rio de Janeiro (city)
Living people
Brazilian footballers
Madureira Esporte Clube players
Brazilian expatriate footballers
Expatriate footballers in Portugal
U.D. Oliveirense players
Association football defenders
S.U. Sintrense players